A Chinese Tall Story is a 2005 Hong Kong fantasy adventure film written and directed by Jeffrey Lau. The story is loosely based on the 16th-century novel Journey to the West.

Synopsis
It is a twisted story about Tang Sanzang and his three disciples who are journeying west to acquire Buddhist scriptures. While stopping in Shache City (present day Yarkand), they come under attack by minions of the evil Tree Demon. The demons capture his three disciples.

Tang Sanzang is then captured by the king of reptiles and placed under the care of the ugly and shunned Meiyan, who falls in love with Sanzang. Luckily for him, an alien princess rescues him, and Meiyan decides to team up with the princess in order to rescue the disciples.

Plot

Tang Sanzang (Nicholas Tse) and his three disciples Sun Wukong (Bolin Chen), Zhu Wuneng (Kenny Kwan), and Sha Wujing (Steven Cheung) arrive triumphantly to a hero's welcome in Shache city. Tripitaka's most arduous challenge to achieve deification is to come, only he can perform.

During their stay in the city, the three disciples are captured by evil Tree Spirits. Tripitaka borrows the Golden Pole and tries to find a way to save them. He meets a young lizard imp Meiyan (Charlene Choi) who is more than a visual match for Quasimodo: matted bushy hair, and teeth of any dentist's nightmare. Meiyan falls in love with Tripitaka at first sight and devotes herself to trailing him. She even sets a love trap to ensnare him. Tripitaka unwittingly falls into the trap and in the process breaks the Heavenly Code.

The region is one full of monsters, strange beings and creatures of unknown origins and among them are the beautiful Princess XiaoShan (Fan Bing-bing) and her army. On a passing journey to Earth her path crosses Tripitaka's and she vows her aid. Tripitaka decides to leave with the Princess.

Meiyan is heartbroken. She picks a fight with Princess XiaoShan and, although she loses, she finally discovers her own identity as a galactic warrior. She eventually helps the princess in defeating the enemy and rescues Tripitaka and his disciples.

After the battle, Meiyan surrenders to the Temple of Heaven for judgment. Torn between passion and righteousness, Tripitaka rebels against the heavens to rescue the gallows-bound Meiyan. A benevolent Buddha is moved and pardons the two on condition that they embark on a journey to the West to accomplish the Eight-One Tasks to redeem themselves and save the world.

Cast
Nicholas Tse as Tang Sanzang
Bolin Chen as Sun Wukong
Kenny Kwan as Zhu Bajie
Steven Cheung as Sha Wujing
Charlene Choi as Yue Meiyan
Fan Bingbing as Princess Xiaoshan
Isabella Leong as Red Child
Patrick Tam
Yuen Wah as Turtle
Kenny Bee
Tats Lau
Yat-fei Wong
Lee Kin-yan
Joe Phua
Michael Chan
Gordon Liu
Kara Hui

Soundtrack

All compositions by Joe Hisaishi.

 "Sacred Love"
 "Prologue - Triumphant Entrance"
 "Dogfight Over Shache"
 "Words Are Lethal"
 "Rout Of The Four Heavenly Knights"
 "Lover's Gambit"
 "Longing for You"
 "Yours Truly, Tripitaka"
 "The Conspiracy"
 "Capitulation"
 "Twirling Snow"
 "Alien Invasion"
 "I Can Fly!"
 "Help Is on the Way"
 "Annihilation Of The Tree Spirit"
 "The Princess's Secret"
 "Storming of the Celestial Court"
 "I Know"
 "Divine Manifestation"
 "A Journey West"

References

External links

Official website of A Chinese Tall Story

2005 films
Hong Kong fantasy adventure films
Cantonese-language films
Films based on Journey to the West
Films directed by Jeffrey Lau
Films scored by Joe Hisaishi